Harrison Michael Froling (born 20 April 1998) is an Australian professional basketball player for the Ipswich Force of the NBL1 North. He had a two-year college career in the United States playing for the SMU Mustangs (2016–17) and the Marquette Golden Eagles (2017–18). In 2018, he joined the Adelaide 36ers of the National Basketball League (NBL) and earned NBL Rookie of the Year honours for the 2018–19 season.

Early life and career
Froling was born and raised in Townsville, Queensland, where he attended Pimlico State High School. In 2014, he moved to Canberra to attend the Australian Institute of Sport and played for the BA Centre of Excellence in the SEABL. In 2015, he split his time between the BA Centre of Excellence in the SEABL and the Townsville Heat in the QBL.

Froling spent the 2015–16 NBL season as a member of the Townsville Crocodiles, playing nine games as an injury replacement for Luke Schenscher. Following the NBL season, he returned to the Heat for the QBL season.

Following the QBL season, Froling moved to the United States to play college basketball for the SMU Mustangs. However, he left the team in December 2016 and transferred to Marquette in January 2017. In 10 games for the Mustangs, he averaged 4.3 points and 3.2 rebounds in 14.6 minutes per game.

In the 2017–18 season, Froling played 20 games for the Marquette Golden Eagles. He was unable to debut until mid-December due to NCAA transfer rules. He averaged 2.8 points and 3.0 rebounds in 12.4 minutes per game.

Professional career
After returning to Townsville and helping the Heat win the 2018 QBL championship, Froling joined the Adelaide 36ers of the National Basketball League (NBL) on a two-year deal. In the 2018–19 season, he won the NBL Rookie of the Year.

In 2019, Froling had a short stint with the Southern Huskies of the New Zealand NBL.

Froling returned to the 36ers for the 2019–20 NBL season. Following the NBL season, he moved to Poland to play for Spójnia Stargard and later played in the Queensland State League (QSL) for the RedCity Roar.

On 17 July 2020, Froling signed with the Brisbane Bullets for the 2020–21 NBL season. Following the NBL season, he joined the Mackay Meteors of the NBL1 North.

On 23 July 2021, Froling signed with the Illawarra Hawks, teaming up with his brother Sam for the 2021–22 NBL season. On 24 January 2022, he scored a career-high 27 points with eight 3-pointers in a 100–89 win over the 36ers.

Froling joined the Hobart Chargers for the 2022 NBL1 South season.

On 28 May 2022, Froling signed with the Brisbane Bullets for the 2022–23 NBL season. On 22 January 2023, he was hospitalised with a serious head injury after getting knocked unconscious during a night out in Wollongong. He discharged himself later that morning before flying back to Brisbane where he was re-admitted to hospital and underwent brain surgery. He was subsequently ruled out for the rest of the season. On 24 January, a 19-year-old man turned himself into police and was charged with reckless grievous bodily harm and affray.

Froling is set to join the Ipswich Force for the 2023 NBL1 North season.

Personal life
Froling is the son of Shane and Jenny Froling, and has two older twin sisters, Alicia and Keely, and a younger brother Sam.

References

External links
NBL player profile
Marquette Golden Eagles bio

Living people
1998 births
Adelaide 36ers players
Australian expatriate basketball people in New Zealand
Australian expatriate basketball people in Poland
Australian expatriate basketball people in the United States
Australian Institute of Sport basketball players
Australian men's basketball players
Brisbane Bullets players
Centers (basketball)
Illawarra Hawks players
Marquette Golden Eagles men's basketball players
SMU Mustangs men's basketball players
Southern Huskies players
Sportspeople from Townsville
Townsville Crocodiles players